This is a list of U.S. universities and colleges that have won the most team sport national championships (more than 15) that have been bestowed for the highest level of collegiate athletic competition, be that at either the varsity or club level, as determined by the governing organization of each sport.

Scope of the list

While many collegiate sports championships in the United States are now sponsored by the NCAA, historically this was not the case, and many championships were organized for decades without NCAA sponsorship.  This list includes both (i) NCAA championships and (ii) titles won in competitions organized by bodies other than the NCAA.

The column in the list below that sets forth NCAA championships includes (but is not limited to) all non-football titles won at the highest level organized by the NCAA (Division I/Collegiate), as of July 1, 2021, for sports years through that date and with updated results for subsequent sports year(s).  (In accordance with the NCAA's own records, this column includes certain "unofficial" NCAA championships won during years the NCAA did not calculate winning team scores – boxing from 1932 through 1947, track and field from 1925–1927, and wrestling in 1928 and 1931–1933.) It also includes the short-lived trampoline titles in 1969–1970. Other championships are set forth in other columns.  For example, women's sports were solely organized by the AIAW rather than the NCAA prior to the 1981–1982 year of dual championships, and these titles are included in their own separate column. Notably, the championship in the highest level of NCAA football (FBS) to date is still not sponsored by the NCAA ("Recognized Football Titles/CFP" column), nor has the oldest organized intercollegiate competition, men's rowing, ever been subject to NCAA control (included in the "Other Team Titles" column).

"Other Team Titles" column
The "Other Team Titles" column includes championships won by schools in one of the 27 sports that are (or were) sponsored by the NCAA or AIAW, during years competitive championships were organized by other bodies. These 27 sports are: women's badminton; baseball; basketball; women's bowling; boxing; cross country; fencing; field hockey; golf; gymnastics; ice hockey; lacrosse; indoor rifle; outdoor rifle; women's rowing; skiing; soccer; softball; swimming; women's synchronized swimming; tennis; indoor track; outdoor track; men's trampoline; volleyball; women's beach volleyball, water polo; and wrestling.  Finally, the "Other Team Titles" column also includes championships won in three other sports: men's rowing (1871–present), which has voluntarily remained outside NCAA sponsorship, and two NCAA "emerging sports" that organize championships, women's equestrian (2002–present) and women's rugby (1991–present).

As more specifically detailed on the table of sports, below, the "Other Team Titles" column includes: (i) historic non-NCAA tournament titles compiled here, (ii) non-AIAW women's championships listed here, (iii) overall women's equestrian championships, (iv) gold medal lacrosse teams listed here and Wingate lacrosse championships, (v) pre-NCAA golf championships (NCAA started sponsoring the golf championship in 1939; the previous 41 championships conferred by the National Intercollegiate Golf Association are in the "Other" column); (vi) pre-NCAA swimming championships; (vii) ISFA soccer championships; and (viii) USA Rugby Women’s Divisions 1 / 1 Elite championships.

It does not include Helms Athletic Foundation or Premo-Porretta Power Poll selections for men's basketball, which were awarded retroactively.

Most collegiate team national championships

Table of sports

See also
List of NCAA schools with the most NCAA Division I championships
List of NCAA schools with the most AIAW Division I national championships
List of college athletics championship game outcomes
Mythical national championship
Helms Athletic Foundation

References and notes

College sports championships in the United States
Schools